Foreign relations exist between Armenia and Portugal. Neither country has a resident ambassador. Armenia is represented in Portugal through its embassy in Rome (Italy).  Portugal is represented in Armenia through its embassy in Moscow. In addition Portugal is represented in Armenia through its honorary consulate on Nalbandyan street in Yerevan. The consul is Mr. Samuel Samuelyan.

Portugal, formally recognized the independence of the Democratic Republic of Armenia on 10 August 1920 "and entered into a solemn compact not only to respect, but to preserve as against external aggression, the territorial integrity and political independence of Armenia..."

Expatriates
One of the most notable Armenians who resided in Portugal was Calouste Gulbenkian. He was a wealthy Armenian businessman and philanthropist, who made Lisbon the headquarters for his businesses. He established an international charity, the Calouste Gulbenkian Foundation, in Lisbon. He also founded the Museu Calouste Gulbenkian in Lisbon.

Political and economic relations
Armenian Foreign Minister Vardan Oskanyan visited Lisbon in November 2000 and met with Portuguese President Jorge Sampaio, and Foreign Minister Jaime Gama. On 10 July 2001, President Robert Kocharyan said that Armenia attached major importance to the development of relations with Portugal. Armenian Foreign Minister Vardan Oskanyan met a Portuguese delegation, on 11 July 2001, with a view to improving bilateral economic relations. The Speaker of the Portuguese parliament, João Bosco Mota Amaral, discussed on 19 June 2002, with the Armenian ambassador, the development and strengthening of Armenian-Portuguese interparliamentary relations.

Armenian genocide 
Portugal recognized the Armenian genocide in 2019.

See also 
 Armenia–EU relations
 Foreign relations of Armenia
 Foreign relations of Portugal 
 Recognition of the Armenian Genocide

References

External links 
 Armenian Ministry of Foreign Affairs: direction of Armenians embassies around the world

 
Portugal 
Bilateral relations of Portugal